David Wayne Terrell (born July 8, 1975) is a former American football safety in the National Football League.  He was drafted by the Washington Redskins in the seventh round of the 1998 NFL Draft with the 191st overall pick. He played college football at Texas-El Paso.

Terrell also played for the Oakland Raiders.

1975 births
Living people
People from Floydada, Texas
American football safeties
UTEP Miners football players
Washington Redskins players
Oakland Raiders players